The women's tournament of the 2014 FIBA 3x3 World Championships hosted in Russia was contested by 24 teams.

Participating teams
Four FIBA zones were represented at the tournament with no team from FIBA Oceania qualifying for the event. The top 24 teams, including the hosts, based on the FIBA National Federation ranking qualified for the tournament.

FIBA Asia (4)
 (10)
 (18)
 (24)
 (19)

FIBA Africa (2)
 (22)
 (15)

FIBA Oceania (0)
 None qualified

FIBA Americas (4)
 (21)
 (5)
 (9)
 (12)

FIBA Europe (14)
 (2)
 (16)
 (3)
 (14)
 (7)
 (6)
 (13)
 (17)
 (11)
 (1)
 (23) (hosts)
 (4)
 (8)
 (20)

Main tournament

Preliminary round

Group A

|

|

|}

Group B

|

|

|}

Group C

|

|

|}

Group D

|

|

|}

Knockout stage

Awards

References

2016
Women
2014 in women's basketball
2014 in Russian women's sport
International women's basketball competitions hosted by Russia